Sharada Sharma (born 1958) is a Nepali writer and poet. Her debut novel, Taap, won the 2012 Padmashree Sahitya Samman award.

Early life and education 
Sharada Sharma was born in 1958 in Syangja, Nepal. Her father was a writer and editor who contributed to various Nepalese publications. Sharma first began writing poetry at eight years old while in Pokhara, where she spent a portion of her childhood. A natural introvert, she found solace in writing.

With the support of her family, she attended Tribhuvan University in Kathmandu, where she studied science and then arts, eventually graduating with a master's degree.

Career 
Sharma first gained recognition in 1982 after publishing a poem in honor of the writer B. P. Koirala. In 1987, she published her first poetry collection, Boundless Emotions. This was followed in 1991 with the short story collection Ruins of Convictions and in 1992 with the poetry collection After the War. In addition to poetry and short stories, she produced a book-length study of Koirala's female characters in 1996.

Overall, she has written around a dozen books, including poetry, short stories, literary criticism, and novels.

Taap, her debut novel, was published in 2012 and won that year's Padmashree Sahitya Sammana, a prestigious Nepalese literary award. The novel weaves together narratives of various individuals from different backgrounds, switching perspectives throughout. It was followed by Kampa, a 2016 novel inspired by the April 2015 Nepal earthquake.

In 2020, her poetry collection Yatrama was shortlisted for the Madan Puraskar award, which was eventually won by Chandra Prakash Baniya's Maharani.

Sharma's writing often deals with themes of spirituality and mysteries of the universe, incorporating a woman's perspective. She conveys a feminist message in both her writing and her work as an activist, including with the Family Planning Association of Nepal.

Personal life 
In 1978, Sharma married the politician Narahari Acharya, with whom she has two children.

Selected works

Poems 

 Seemanta Anubhooti ("Boundless Emotions," 1987) 
 Yuddhoparant ("After the War," 1992)
 Swarnasutra, ("Golden Rules," 1995)
 Yatrama (2019)

Short stories 

 Aasthako Bhagnawasesh ("Ruins of Convictions," 1991)
 Agnisparsha ("A Touch of Fire," 2013)

Novels 

 Taap ("Burning," 2012)
 Kampa ("Tremors," 2016)

Literary criticism 

 B.P. Koiralaka Naaripatra: Drishtikon ra Aakangshya ("B.P. Koirala’s Women Characters: Perspectives and Expectations," 1996)

References 

1958 births
Living people
20th-century Nepalese writers
21st-century Nepalese writers
Nepali-language writers from Nepal
20th-century Nepalese poets
21st-century Nepalese poets
Nepalese women poets
Nepalese feminists
People from Syangja District
Tribhuvan University alumni
Padmashree Sahitya Puraskar winners